Hövding ("The Chieftain", in Swedish) is an airbag bicycle helmet, launched in November 2011. 

Hövding was invented by Anna Haupt and Terese Alstin in Malmö, Sweden in 2005 as a master thesis for the founders' Master of Industrial Design at the Faculty of Engineering at Lund University in Sweden. Their studies included the comparison of accelerometer data from bicycle crashes against 'typical' cycling. The Hövding contains accelerometers that detect unusual movements which then deploys the airbag if the movement patterns match the profile of a crash. Each Hövding airbag also contains a "Black Box" that records the accelerometer data 10 seconds before a deployment. The Hövding collar is constructed of a waterproof material, and has interchangeable fabric "shells" that allow colour customisation.

The two founders Anna Haupt and Terese Alstin left the company in 2015.

Hövding is CE certified 

In March 2015, Hövding 2.0 was released. These changes include improvements to the weight, comfort and change in location of the USB port.

Hövding 3.0 was introduced in September 2019, with new features such as a BOA dial-based adjustment for universal fit, and Bluetooth connectivity to smart phones for firmware updates and automatically sending crash notifications to emergency contacts after a deployment.

Safety tests

Folksam
In 2012 the Swedish insurance company Folksam tested 13 cycle helmets on the market. They carried out an impact test on the same principles as for CE marking but with a higher impact speed, 25 km/h instead of 20 km/h.
 
All the traditional helmets achieved G-force ranging from 196 to 294 g. The lower the value, the better the helmet’s ability to protect the cyclist’s head in an accident. Hövding achieved 65 g, providing at least three times better shock absorption than the other helmets.

Que Choisir
A test by French Que Choisir concluded that Hövding did not meet international safety requirements, according to the magazine of the Swedish Consumers' Association. The critique against Hövding was that the helmet did not fully protect against impact with hard, narrow objects, such as curbstones or metal posts. Hövding refuted the critique, claiming that the tests was irrelevant as the helmet is so different in design that normal standards cannot be used; instead they referred to the tests performed during the CE certification, which show Hövding to be far safer than the average bike helmet. Que Choisir, in turn, stated that the laboratory they used for the tests is highly reputable and that the tests are still relevant regardless of design. Another critique Hövding received from Que Choisir was the inflation time. Que Choisir stated the inflation time as being 382 ms which, compared with airbags for motorcycles that have a limit of maximum 200 ms, is almost twice as long. There is, however a difference in crash velocities between motorcycles and bicycles and tests showed that it deployed as it should in a test crash by a stunt person. The test by Que Choisir was performed on Hövding 1.0, whether the issues have been addressed for the release of Hövding 2.0 is unknown as no new tests has been performed.

Stanford University 
A team of bioengineers performed a series of drop tests on the Hovding and concluded that there is an eight-fold reduction in the risk of concussion compared to traditional helmets. The thickness and stiffness of the Hovding was described as "near perfect" in protecting against concussion and head injury. They did, however, find that the air pressure inside the helmet was critical for optimum performance. Partial inflation could cause the helmet to bottom out, where it would give less protection than an expanded polystyrene helmet.

Certimoov 
In 2021, French helmet testing organization Certimoov ranked the Hövding highest among the 156 bicycle helmets it had tested to date. They gave the Hövding an overall safety rating of 4.5 out of 5, the only helmet to score higher than 4.

Awards 
Anna Haupt and Terese Alstin won the Index:Award 2011,  and D&AD Award in 2012.

Criticism is mainly focused on the price of the Hövding, and questions about its functionality during certain types of crashes.

References

External links 
 Hövding website

Bicycle helmets